Roberto Marcher (born 1946) is a Brazilian former professional tennis player.

Born in Porto Alegre, Marcher was a collegiate tennis player for Florida State University during the late 1960s. He made two doubles main draw appearance at the US Open, including in 1970 when he and Thomaz Koch reached the second round. Following his time on tour he began working as a tennis promotor back in Brazil, where he was the first to organise a local tennis circuit. More recently he served as tournament director of the ATP Tour's Brasil Open.

References

External links
 
 

1946 births
Living people
Brazilian male tennis players
Florida State Seminoles men's tennis players
Sportspeople from Porto Alegre
Tournament directors
Sports promoters
21st-century Brazilian people
20th-century Brazilian people